Ukraine have appeared in only three UEFA European Championships – Euro 2012, Euro 2016, and Euro 2020. Before 1996, some of its players played for the Soviet Union national team and CIS national team – Oleksiy Mykhailychenko, Hennadiy Lytovchenko, Oleh Luzhnyi, Ivan Hetsko and others.

For Euro 2012, they qualified automatically as one of the host countries. This marked their début at the major European football tournament. In their opening game against Sweden, Ukraine won 2–1 in Kyiv. Despite the team's efforts, the co-hosts were eliminated after a 0–2 loss to France and a 0–1 loss to England, all in Donetsk. The UEFA Euro 2012 was the second ever international final that Ukraine appeared following their international finals debut in the 2006 FIFA World Cup.

For Euro 2016, Ukraine qualified via the play-offs, defeating Slovenia. They qualified for Euro 2020 by finishing top of their qualifying group, and reached the quarter-finals of the tournament for the first time after defeating Sweden 2–1 in the round of 16 after extra time, before being eliminated by England.

Euro 2012

Group stage

Euro 2016

Group stage

Euro 2020

Group stage

Ranking of third-placed teams

Knockout phase

Round of 16

Quarter-finals

Overall record
 Champions   Runners-up   Third place   Fourth place  

*Denotes draws including knockout matches decided via penalty shoot-out.
**Gold background colour indicates that the tournament was won.
***Red border colour indicates that the tournament was held on home soil.

See also

 Ukraine at the FIFA World Cup

References

Countries at the UEFA European Championship